Mimobarathra is a genus of moths of the family Noctuidae erected by William Barnes and James Halliday McDunnough in 1915. Its only species, Mimobarathra antonito, was first described by Barnes in 1907. It is found in the US state of Arizona.

References

Hadeninae
Monotypic moth genera